Presidency College is an art, commerce, and science college in the city of Chennai in Tamil Nadu, India. On 16 October 1840, this school was established as the Madras Preparatory School before being repurposed as a high school, and then a graduate college. The Presidency College is one of the oldest government arts colleges in India. It is one of two Presidency Colleges established by the British in India, the other being the Presidency College, Kolkata.

History 

Sir Thomas Munro asked for a Committee of Public Instruction to form in 1826. In 1836, the committee's duties changed to the "Committee of Native Education". The plans drawn up by the committee did not commend themselves to the Governor of Madras, Lord Elphinstone, who proposed nineteen resolutions that passed unanimously.

Elphinstone chose E. B. Powell, a University of Cambridge Wrangler in mathematics, to be the first principal, and Powell accepted the post. He arrived in Mumbai (Bombay) on September 20, 1840, but did not reach Chennai (Madras) until 24 November. Meanwhile, the committee had invited Cooper from Hoogly College, Kolkata, to temporarily carry out the principal duties at a salary of Rs 400 per month. Cooper accepted the invitation and came to Chennai (Madras). He and his staff opened Presidency School, a preparatory school, in a rented building in Egmore known as Edinburgh Home, on 16 October 1840. Cooper remained in the primary school for only a few months. Soon after Powell's arrival, and before the high school department opened on 12 April 1841, he returned to Kolkata. The preparatory school shifted to Popham's Broadway in 1841.

The schools grew into Presidency College. When the University of Madras was founded in 1857, Presidency College became affiliated with it.

In 1870, the college moved to its present location in Kamaraj Salai, opposite Marina Beach.

Ranking
Presidency College is ranked AIR 7th by NIRF 2021 for college ranking. The 2022 NIRF ranking of the college is 3rd in the college category.

Notable alumni
Alagappa Alagappan (1925–2014), Indian-born American founder of the Hindu Temple Society of North America
Alladi Ramakrishnan, Founder of Institute of Mathematical Sciences
Vallal Dr. RM. Alagappa Chettiar, (1909–1957), Industrialist and Philanthropist
E. S. Appasamy (1878–1963), educator, social worker in Chennai.
K. Seshadri Iyer - Dewan of Mysore
Diwan Bahadur Siram.Venkataramadas Nayudu, Diwan of Pudukkottai and Former Chief secretary and Magistrate of Madras Presidency.
T. R. A. Thumboo Chetty First Indian Chief Judge of the Chief Court of Mysore, Offg. Dewan of Mysore.
Subrahmanyan Chandrasekhar - Nobel laureate in Physics
Bharat Ratna C. V. Raman, Nobel laureate in Physics
Bharat Ratna C. Rajagopalachari, the last Governor-General of India
Bharat Ratna C. Subramaniam - Minister, Finance Government of India
G. P. Pillai, freedom fighter, close aide to Gandhiji during South African Indian issue
Singaravelar,Veteran Communist leader 
T. M. Nair, one of the founders of Justice Party
K. M. Cariappa, first Commander-in-Chief of Defence Forces of independent India
Benegal Rama Rau, Governor, Reserve Bank of India
S. Jagannathan, Governor, Reserve Bank of India
K. V. K. Sundaram, Chief Election Commissioner of India (1958–1967)
P. Chidambaram, Former Finance Minister of India
M. P. Periasamy Thooran
P Rajagopalachari, Dewan of Cochi state and Travancore
V Gopalsamy (Vaiko), Former MP, Founder of MDMK
N. Ram, managing director and Editor in Chief, The Hindu
G. N. Balasubramaniam, Carnatic vocalist
V. S. Chandralekha, politician and former IAS officer
Paravastu Chinnayya Soori, Telugu scholar
Sarvepalli Gopal, chairman, National Book Trust and historian
Nataraja Guru
C. P. Ramaswamy Iyer, Dewan of Travancore
P. S. Sivaswami Iyer, Law Member of the Viceroy's Executive Council
V. K. Krishna Menon (1896–1974), Defence Minister of India (1957–1962)
C. R. Pattabhiraman, Minister, Law and Company Affairs, GOI
Palani G. Periyasamy, businessman
Ganapathi Thanikaimoni, Palynologist, Fyson Prize recipient
Uma Sambanthan, social activist
K. K. Srinivasan, founder of a pre-school for hearing-impaired children
R. S. Subbalakshmi, educator and social reformer
P. Subbarayan, Chief Minister of Madras
K. Subrahmanyam, Secretary, Defence Production, Government of India
Srinivasa Varadhan, Abel Prize laureate in Mathematics
R. K. Krishna Kumar, Former director of Tata Sons and Padma Shri awardee
T. R. Seshadari, Chemist and Padma Bhushan award
O. V. Vijayan, author and cartoonist, 
Toppur Seethapathy Sadasivan, Plant pathologist and Padma Bhushan awardee
C. V. Subramanian, Mycologist, Shanti Swarup Bhatnagar Prize recipient
Pothan Joseph, Journalist
Janaki Ammal, Botanist and Padma Shri awardee
Thavamani Jegajothivel Pandian, Geneticist and Shanti Swarup Bhatnagar Prize recipient
T. R. Govindachari, Natural product chemist, Shanti Swarup Bhatnagar laureate
K. S. Hegde, Supreme court Judge and Speaker of the Lok Sabha
M K Stalin, Chief Minister of Tamil Nadu
M M Ismail, Former chief justice madras high court
K R Ramanathan, physicist and meteorologist.
Vazhakkulangarayil Khalid, Justice of the Supreme Court of India 
M.B Sreenivasan - Music director
Edatata Narayanan, journalist and freedom fighter
K.G Subramanyan, artist. He was awarded the Padma Vibhushan
Psycho Muhammad, psychologist 
Govindarajan Padmanaban, biochemist and biotechnologist
Kasu Brahmananda Reddy, Former Chief minister Andhra Pradesh 
P. V. Rajamannar, Chief Justice Madras High Court
A. L. Abdul Majeed, Sri Lankan politician and Member of Parliament
Nilakanta Mahadeva Ayyar, member of the erstwhile Indian Civil Service
C. V. Runganada Sastri, interpreter, civil servant and polyglot
Sarah Chakko, first woman to be elected to the presidency of the World Council of Churches. 
M. K. Chandrashekaran, zoologist, founder of Indian chronobiology
P. Coomaraswamy, member of the Legislative Council of Ceylon
V. L. Ethiraj, philanthropist 
Salim Ghouse, actor 
T. R. Govindachari, chemist 
S. Srinivasa Iyengar, freedom-fighter 
L. V. Ramaswami Iyer, Indian linguist 
K. Rajah Iyer, Advocate-General of Madras Presidency
Sarukkai Jagannathan, tenth Governor of the Reserve Bank of India
Kadambur R. Janarthanan, Union minister of India
K. S. Venkataramani, lawyer and an acclaimed writer in English
V. Kanakasabhai, lawyer and historian
Sonti Kamesam, timber engineer and scientist
Kanmani, film director
Pattathuvila Karunakaran, film producer and short story writer
Gopalan Kasturi, Editor of The Hindu 
M. O. P Iyengar, prominent Indian botanist and phycologist
Dr. V. Shanta, oncologist 
Gana Bala, Playback Singer
Pushpavanam Kuppusamy, Folk Singer 
Thol. Thirumavalavan, Indian politician
Moosa Raza 
Dr. A. K. Viswanathan IPS 
T. Ananda 
P. S. Sivaswami Iyer, Vice chancellor Madras University 
S. Subramania Iyer, Vice chancellor Madras University 
Palapatti Sadaya Goundar Kailasam, Chief Justice of Madras High Court
B. Jagannadha Das, Judge of the Supreme Court of India
D. Ramanaidu, Dadasaheb Phalke award recipient and Former MP
Mithavaadi Krishnan, Social reformer
Moorkoth Ramunny, First Malayalee pilot in the Royal Indian Air Force
Kezhekapt Rukmini Menon, Second woman to be a career diplomat in India
O. V. Alagesan, Freedom fighter and Minister of States 
K. Kunjunniraja, Writer and Scholar
Santishree Dhulipudi Pandit, Vice Chancellor of Jawaharlal Nehru University 
 T. J. Gnanavel, Film Director

Notable faculty
E. B. Powell
Sarvepalli Radhakrishnan
John Mathai
Alfred Gibbs Mourne 
Philip Furley Fyson 
Mark Hunter (Civil Servant)
E. W. Middlemast 
Gustav Solomon Oppert 
Harold Papworth 
Peter Percival 
A. Chakravarthi 
Paravastu Chinnayasuri 
T. R. Govindachari 
P. C. Kokila
T. P. Meenakshisundaram 
Mu. Metha 
Chirayinkeezhu Ramakrishnan Nair 
M. Nannan 
Samuel Satthianadhan 
B. G. L. Swami 
Atoor Ravi Varma
Perumal Murugan
M. O. P Iyengar 
U.V. Swaminatha Iyer, Tamil scholar

In popular culture 
Presidency College (mainly its campus) was the place where many films were shot, including:

 Mouna Ragam (1986)
 Nayakan (1987), court scenes
Iyer the Great (1990)
Idhayam (1991)
 Thiruda Thiruda (1993), government office scenes
 Maanbumigu Manavan (1996)
 Kadhal Desam (1996)
 Sipayi (1996)
 Aaytha Ezhuthu (2004)
 Nanban (2012), hostel scenes
 The Man Who Knew Infinity (2015)

References

External links 

 Official website

Presidency College, Chennai
Arts and Science colleges in Chennai
Colleges affiliated to University of Madras
Educational institutions established in 1840